Propel or propelling may refer to:

 Propulsion, to push forward or drive an object forward
 Samsung A767 Propel, a mobile phone
 Samsung i627 Propel Pro
 Propel Fitness Water, a drink from the makers of Gatorade
 Propel (PHP), an object-relational mapping solution for PHP
 Propel, a steroid eluting sinus stent
 Propel (political party), a political party in Wales

See also
 
 
 Propeller (disambiguation)